Gerry Anderson & Christopher Burr's Terrahawks, usually referred to simply as Terrahawks, is a 1980s British science fiction television series produced by Anderson Burr Pictures for London Weekend Television and created by the production team of Gerry Anderson and Christopher Burr. The show was Anderson's first in over a decade to use puppets for its characters, and also his last. Anderson's previous puppet-centric TV series included Thunderbirds and Captain Scarlet and the Mysterons.

Set in the year 2020, the series follows the adventures of the Terrahawks, a taskforce responsible for protecting Earth from invasion by a group of extraterrestrial androids and aliens led by Zelda. Like Anderson's previous puppet series, futuristic vehicles and technology featured prominently in each episode.

Premise

The series is set in the year 2020, after an alien force has destroyed NASA's Mars base and Earth is under threat. A small organisation, The Terrahawks, is set up to defend the planet. From Hawknest, their secret base in South America, they develop sophisticated weapons to prepare for the battles to come.

Terrahawks was less straight-laced than any of Anderson's previous series, featuring a wry, tongue-in-cheek humour as well as dramatic jeopardy. The ensemble cast, with each member assigned a vehicle, had many similarities with Anderson's Thunderbirds, whilst the alien invasion plot was reminiscent of Captain Scarlet and the Mysterons and the live action UFO.

History
Prior to Terrahawks and throughout the entirety of the 1960s, Anderson's series were noted for their use of his patented Supermarionation technique, which made use of electronically augmented marionettes (the final series to use this technique was the live action/Supermarionation hybrid The Secret Service in 1969; Anderson switched to live action production beginning with 1970's UFO). In contrast, producers of Terrahawks made use of latex muppet-style hand puppets to animate the characters, in a process Anderson dubbed Supermacromation.

This was partly dictated by the relatively low budget (latex hand puppets being much cheaper to produce than the sculpted wooden marionettes of previous series), but the absence of strings allowed for much smoother movement, and could be used to more easily produce the illusion of the puppets walking. The necessarily static puppets of previous series had been a source of frustration to Anderson during his Supermarionation days.

Production
The series' most prolific contributor, Tony Barwick, constantly used tongue-in-cheek aliases whenever he wrote a different episode, calling himself, for instance, "Anne Teakstein," and "Felix Catstein." (He was not alone in this; Donald James wrote the episodes "From Here To Infinity" and "The Sporilla" under the names "Katz Stein" and "Leo Pardstein" respectively.) The only episodes of the series not credited to pseudonyms ending in "-stein" are "The Midas Touch," scripted by Trevor Lansdowne and Tony Barwick, the latter billed under his real name for the only time on the series, and the two-part opener "Expect The Unexpected," written by Gerry Anderson.

The first 13 episodes were filmed on a budget of £3 million at Bray Studios with a crew of 65.

A fourth series would have developed the characters of Stew Dapples ("Stewed Apples") and Kate Kestrel further. This was explained in a documentary on the special features disc of the series, in the Gerry Anderson book Supermarionation and the Terrahawks DVDs. Two of the scripts were called "101 Seed" (a parody of the title "Number One Seed"), written by Anderson himself (as "Gerry Anderstein"), and "Attempted MOIDer" by Tony Barwick (alias in this case D.I. Skeistein).

In the UK, six specially prepared compilations of Terrahawks were released on video cassette, covering 24 out of 26 episodes from the first series. The first tape contained a few scenes in the premiere episode that had been edited out of the broadcast master due to time constraints (those scenes are not on DVD). The final volume, entitled "Zero Strikes Back" had a smaller print run than the rest of the tapes, and was quite a collectors' item, with copies generally going for around £100 on eBay until the series began to be released on DVD. The series is available on DVD in the United Kingdom and North America. A Blu-ray release of the first series was released in June 2016.

Unlike virtually all of Gerry Anderson's other puppet-based series, Terrahawks was not produced by ITC Entertainment. This meant that after Terrahawks repeats disappeared from UK airwaves in the late 1980s and the six compilation video tapes went out of production, the series was noticeably hard to find compared to Anderson's other series, most of which received a renaissance throughout the 1990s.

Title sequence and end credits
The opening and closing sequences were created using hand-drawn cel animation to imitate computer graphics. The opening title sequence begins with a video game playing on a screen when Doctor "Tiger" Ninestein appears and says: "Terrahawks! Stay on this channel! This is an emergency!". The end credits, the Zeroid and Cube robots would often "play" noughts and crosses (tic-tac-toe) with each other, resulting in a different winner each week (the Cubes usually had to cheat and steal a Zeroid's position in order to win). The exception to this was the episode "A Christmas Miracle", which featured the song "I Believe in Christmas" as sung by Kate Kestrel played over a still of a Zeroid.

The original opening title sequence was used for both the United States and the UK versions of the series, but a different version of the end credits was produced for the US variant, featuring a Zeroid bouncing up and down next to one of Zelda's Cubes as a "Kate Kestrel" song plays. At the conclusion of the credits the Zeroid jumps off of the screen and crashes back down onto the Cube.

When the series was purchased for airing in Japan, the title and ending credits were augmented by an all-new anime-style sequence, the first highlighting the Terrahawks craft and the Zeroids, and the ending credits showcasing a lonesome spacesuited female remembering her life on Earth as Spacehawk flies over her.

Music
Without the lavish budgets of his earlier television series, it was apparent to Gerry Anderson from a very early stage of production that it would not be possible to record full orchestral scores for Terrahawks. However, the development of synthesised music had advanced considerably since the early days of the experimental 'electromusic' composed and recorded by Barry Gray for Supercar and Fireball XL5, and by 1983 it was possible to create electronic music that could at least approach the scale and majesty of a full orchestra, but at a fraction of the cost.

Richard Harvey was introduced to Anderson by a mutual friend, music producer Tony Prior, who has previously suggested Derek Wadsworth as composer of the music for Space: 1999 Year Two. A graduate of the Royal College of Music with a background in ancient and classical music, Harvey had worked extensively with film composer Maurice Jarre in the late 1970s. This experience made him the ideal choice to compose the music for Terrahawks, combining his knowledge of the structure of classical orchestral music with the latest synthesised music reproduction techniques. Anderson and his business partner Christoper Burr had regular meetings with Harvey to discuss the style of music that they wanted for Terrahawks, particularly the main theme which was envisaged as a combination of the 'best bits' of the themes to Star Wars, E.T. and Dallas.

In 2002, Fanderson records released a soundtrack compiling 75 minutes worth of music, the album included 3 of Harvey’s Demo Themes for the show, 6 full episode scores and 3 surviving Kate Kestrel songs, "S.O.S", "It’s So Easy" and the latter half of "Living in the 21st Century" which was used as the End Titles music in the U.S. syndication run. The remaining songs and first half of "Living in the 21st Century" are currently missing, presumed destroyed.

Audio revival
It was announced on 19 April 2014 that Terrahawks would be returning as a run of full cast audio dramas featuring original cast members. The new audio series were produced by Anderson Entertainment in association with Big Finish Productions. The first new series was released in April 2015, and consists of eight episodes. Ann Ridler who played Kate Kestrel and Cy-Star was replaced by Beth Chalmers, as Ridler had since died, and Windsor Davies who played Sergeant Major Zero was replaced by Jeremy Hitchen, as Davies had retired from acting.

A second series was released by Big Finish Productions in April 2016, and a third in July 2017. Free sample episodes are available on the Big Finish website.

Characters

The Terrahawks
Terrahawks (technically, the Earth Defence Squadron) is an elite task force that protects Earth from alien invasion.
 Doctor "Tiger" Ninestein (real first name unknown): Terrahawk's pilot and the team's leader, so named as he is the ninth clone created by Dr. Gerhard Stein. Somewhat bloodthirsty, his first reaction to alien contact is often to blast it out of the sky. In between alien attacks, he is often seen trying (and failing) to beat the high score of 750 points on his favourite video game. Ninestein's catchphrases are "Expect the unexpected", "I have a theory..." and, when frustrated, he often cries, "Flaming thunderbolts!" He also has a love-hate relationship with the Zeroids, particularly Sergeant Major Zero, and tends to push around Hawkeye. If he is killed, he can be replaced within 24 hours by another of the nine clones; his nickname of "Tiger" comes from the myth of cats similarly having "nine lives". Tiger's voice was provided by Jeremy Hitchen, who claimed he provided that voice in somewhat of an imitation of Jack Nicholson.
 Captain Mary Falconer: Battlehawk's pilot. She acts as Ninestein's second-in-command, weighing his offensive tendencies with her own regard for the value of life, whether in regards to one of Zelda's henchmen, or to the Zeroids. She was voiced by Denise Bryer. Bryer used her normal voice for the role, unlike many of her other famous roles where she normally tended to use a "clucking" tone more typical of the voice of the character Zelda from Terrahawks, whom Bryer also voiced.
 Captain Kate Kestrel (real name: Katherine Westley): The pilot of the Hawkwing fighter aircraft and number three in Terrahawks' chain of command. Kate is also an internationally famous pop singer. Her record company is "Anderburr Records" – a portmanteau of "Anderson" and "Burr." Her colleagues at the record company have no idea she also works for Terrahawks, and she often disappears on a mission partway through a recording session. She was voiced by Anne Ridler when speaking; Moya Griffiths (now Moya Ruskin) provided her singing voice. Beth Chalmers provides the voice of Kate in the audio productions, due to Ridler's death in 2011.
 Lieutenant Hawkeye (real name: Hedley Howard Henderson III): Hawkwing's gunner. Due to a track-and-field accident, his eyes have been replaced with micro-computers that enhance his targeting abilities. When given an order, he always replies "aye-aye" as a pun on his name. He is number four in the Terrahawk chain of command. Hawkeye's voice was provided by Jeremy Hitchen.
 Lieutenant Hiro (full name unknown): The commander of Spacehawk, Hiro keeps a large collection of flowers to which he gives names and reads poetry. As number five in Terrahawks' chain of command, his thick Japanese accent is sometimes a source of humour. Like Ninestein, Hiro was voiced by Jeremy Hitchen.
 
 Zeroids: Spherical robots that perform ground operations and serve as the firepower for the Spacehawk. There are two leaders among the Zeroids who exhibit human-like capacity for thought and emotion, much to the mechanophobic Ninestein's annoyance, who believes they should be unthinking, unfeeling machines that blindly follow orders; Sergeant Major Zero (voiced by Windsor Davies in a characterisation not dissimilar from his portrayal of Sergeant Major Williams in It Ain't Half Hot, Mum), commands the Zeroids stationed on Earth, while Space Sergeant 101 (voiced by Ben Stevens) directs the Zeroids stationed aboard Spacehawk; 101 and Zero often have arguments over command of Spacehawk. Other Zeroids are given distinct personality traits of their own, such as the Zeroid Dix-Huit, whose name is French for his number, eighteen, and who speaks French and has a handlebar moustache, 55, who bobs up and down in rhyme, 21, who has a stutter, and 66, who has a very thick Scottish accent. These accents irk Dr. Ninestein to the point he demanded they all be re-voiced in "The Gun", only for Zero to get back at him by giving them all his own voice. They can increase their mass (becoming as heavy as a black hole), which allows them to perform devastating body-crash manoeuvres. This is often accompanied by a cry of "St-roll on!" Sergeant Major Zero, for his part, as he launched into action, often gave the war cry of "GERONIMO!!!" Unlike the other cast members, Windsor Davies usually only voiced Sergeant Major Zero and The Sporilla (although in a couple of episodes he also provided the voice of another Zeroid, Dr. Killjoy), and in the Big Finish audio series the role of Zero was taken over by Jeremy Hitchen.
 Colonel Johnson (first name unknown): The head of WASA (World Aeronautics & Space Administration). Though he is ostensibly Terrahawks' co-director, in reality, Ninestein constantly overrides his authority. Jeremy Hitchen provided Colonel Johnson's voice, as well as those of Hiro and Ninestein.

Terrahawks vehicles
 Terrahawk – A flying command centre, which can detach from the main body of the Battlehawk. This is Dr. Ninestein's personal ship which he can be seen in the Pilot seat and Terrahawk is 95 feet long.
 Battlehawk – A heavy-duty carrier aircraft which transports the Zeroids, the Megazoid-manned Battletank for heavy support, and other auxiliary equipment. Battlehawk is 265 feet long and is part of Terrahawk, Battlehawk is the Proclaimed Flag of the Terrahawks.
 Hawkwing – A fighter aircraft with a separate over-wing, which can be released to act as a flying impact bomb. Hawkwing has a body of 70 feet and a wing span of 100 feet.
 Treehawk – A single-stage-to-orbit spaceship, which transports personnel, such as Lieutenant Hiro, to the Spacehawk. Treehawk is also 80 feet long and flies into a part of space hawk for entry and exit.
 Spacehawk – An orbital battle station, customarily manned by Lieutenant Hiro, that provides the first line of defence against an attack. Spacehawk is 1600 feet in diameter and has a giant laser that can come out of the base.
 Overlander – A three-segment land vehicle used for transporting goods. In all of its appearances, it has been hijacked and subsequently destroyed.
 Battletank – A tank manned by a pair of Megazoids, usually used for major combat operations. It is transported by the Battlehawk, and is dropped out of its bay onto the ground.
 Spacetank – A tank designed for operations in a vacuum. It only appeared in one episode, manned by Zero and Dix Huit.
 Hudson – Ninestein's Rolls-Royce of indeterminate model, equipped with artificial intelligence and the ability to change its color. Ninestein is particularly fond of it, although Kate seems to use it the most.
 Hawklet –  A small two seater space craft that is stationed in Spacehawk's hangar bay. It appears only in the episodes "First Strike" and "Jolly Roger One".
 MEV –  A space craft stationed aboard Spacehawk. It is outfitted with tread tracks for traversing terrain, and a grappling arm fitted with a cannon.
 Groundhawk –  A bomb disposal and demolition vehicle that appears only in the episodes "Child's Play" and "Space Giant".

Aliens

Robots ("androids") from the planet Guk rebelled when their creators and masters deteriorated into a state of apathy. Zelda and company are modelled after the oldest and wisest citizens of their planet, explaining their grey hair and wrinkled skin. Zelda hopes to conquer Earth and make it a home for her Family of Androids and NONE-Human Beings.
They need to consume only small amounts of silicate minerals a month to sustain their functions.
 Zelda. The main villain of the series, Zelda is the wicked and scheming would-be conqueror of Earth. She has power over matter, mainly used to teleport her servants to and from Earth and to manipulate the size of any of her ships or aliens. "Zelda reclaims her own," Dr. Ninestein frequently says whenever Zelda teleports a defeated minion back to the Mars base. She was created as a bodyguard for Prince Zegar of Guk, but her inherently programmed ambition led to a revolt by herself and her fellow androids. She is known for referring to humans as "Earth-scum", "Earth-pukes" and "Earth-Wretches". She believes the humans are evil and that she is there to deliver the universe from their evil, destructive ways. Her voice was provided by Denise Bryer.
 Cy-star, pronounced "Si-ster." Zelda's "daughter" is not very bright, but is endlessly bubbly and optimistic. Frequently she gets so excited her hair slides around her head, leading Zelda to shout, in one episode, "One of these days I'm going to nail that to your skull!" She gives birth to It-star around the start of the third series. Her catchphrase is, "I don't understand" and "WONNNNNNDERFUL!" Her voice was provided on television by Anne Ridler and on audio by Beth Chalmers.
 Yung-Star. Zelda's "son," Yung-Star is lazy, greedy, cowardly, and only slightly more intelligent than his "sister" – he mistakes the term "nincompoop" for a compliment. However, despite or because of receiving the brunt of Zelda's abuse, he sometimes shows initiative and is far more curious about his surroundings, qualifying him to be occasionally sent to accompany a monster. His catchphrase, uttered slowly in a revolting guttural voice, was "Great Steaming Lava!" Strangely enough, although an android, Yung-Star is partial to bowls of "granite crunchies" – rocks in a slimy green goo; he consumes these frequently, leading Zelda to call him gluttonous since, as stated, the Guk androids need only to consume small amounts of silicate minerals to sustain their functions. He was voiced by Ben Stevens.
 It-Star is also known as "Goybirl" or "Birlgoy," since Cy-Star never decided on what gender this construct would be. It-Star is a "baby" android mothered by Cy-Star near the end of the series. It-Star is a clearly a hermaphrodite with two minds and voices, a young girl's voice when "innocent," and a male voice with a German accent when plotting. His plotting personality is highly vicious and clever, compared to the childish, infant-like one, earning his "grandmother's" respect. The female voice was done by Denise Bryer while the male voice was by Jeremy Hitchen.
 Cubes are the aliens' answer to the Zeroids. They can combine into large constructs such as guns and force field cubicles. Their different sides are marked differently, indicating their different functions, such as one serving as a gun. Cy-Star keeps one, Pluto, as a pet.

Zelda's monsters
Zelda possesses a collection of monstrous servants, Outcasts from various worlds or civilizations, who she keeps in cryogenic storage until needed.
 Sram is a reptilian beast with a devastating roar, capable of shattering mountains and destroying Hawkwing's shots before they can get close enough to hit him. His blood gives off fumes that are highly toxic to human beings. In his first appearance Sram is quite articulate, but he does not speak in any further appearances. Sram appears in "Thunder-Roar," "Thunder Path," as Zelda's drummer in "Play it Again, Sram", a member of Zelda's war party in "First Strike", and a hallucination of him is seen in "Mind Monster". He also makes a brief cameo in the audio episode "The Prisoner of Zelda".
 The Sporilla is a savagely powerful beast that Zelda controls with a signalling device. After the device is destroyed, however, the Terrahawks find that the Sporilla is capable of halting speech and has no desire to fight them. Appears in "The Sporilla." In "Space Giant," another Sporilla appears. The Sporilla is a 7-foot tall metal-eating space gorilla (SPace gORILLA), covered in an off-white fur, a black gorilla face with horns and fangs. An imaginary Sporilla appears in "Mind Monster", while another (real) Sporilla is Cystar's co-pilot in "My Enemy's Enemy".
 MOID: The Master Of Infinite Disguise. He is a skeleton-like alien with almost non-existent facial features, and endowed with the capacity to assume the physical appearance of anyone. "I wear many faces, but have none of my own," he once said to describe himself. The Terrahawks seem to find him pitiable, and he seems to regret living a life of servitude to Zelda. Despite working for her, he is also unwilling to take anyone's life. Appears in "Happy Madeday," "Unseen Menace," and briefly in "Play it Again, Sram" as Mozart before returning in the audio episode "The Prisoner of Zelda", where his origins are finally explored. He seems to have feelings for Kate Kestrel. A hallucination of him is seen in "Mind Monster."
 Yuri is a teddy bear-like creature the aliens find hideous and frightening. He possesses the power to mentally control metal (his name appears to be a reference to Uri Geller, who claims to have similar powers in real life.) Zelda sometimes refers to him as "the furry Napoleon." He appears in "The Ugliest Monster of All," "Operation SAS," "Terratomb," and as a member of Zelda's war party in "First Strike." He returned in the audio episode "Living Legend".
 Lord Tempo. The master of time, Tempo can travel back and forth in time at will, and alter its flow locally. Lord Tempo appears in "My Kingdom for a ZEAF!", "Time Warp", "Timesplit", and as a member of Zelda's war party in "First Strike".
 Tamura the space Samurai is a good and honourable alien with a powerful space cruiser, the "Ishimo". He intervenes in the dispute between Zelda and the Terrahawks with the aim of resolving the dispute. He is duped by Zelda who plans to double-cross him in order to destroy the Terrahawks. He finds out in time and Zelda's plan fails. He refers to Hiro is his "kindred spirit". He appears in the episode "Space Samurai".
 The Krell is a hairy creature with an eyestalk that can fire a laser beam powerful enough to shoot down objects in orbit. It appears only in "The Midas Touch".
 Cyclops is a black and red crawling creature with one giant eye. The cyclops absorbs metal. It appears only in "Space Cyclops".
 Captain Goat is a space buccaneer who captained a pirate radio ship. He appears in "Jolly Roger One" and "Set Sail for Misadventure".
 Cold Finger is an alien who is an expert at weaponising water and ice. His entire ship was made of ice. He only appears in Cold Finger.

Audio-only characters

Characters who only appear in the Big Finish audio series include;
 Lois Price is a NASA operative who was sent to Hawknest to investigate the necessity of the continued funding of the Terrahawks project. She also became unintentionally involved in a plot by her commanding officer to eliminate the Terrahawks and later went behind her superiors' backs to give Ninestein command of the X-99 fleet. Voiced by Beth Chalmers, she appears in "The Price is Right", "Chain of Command", "My Enemy's Enemy", "Set Sail for Misadventure", "The Prisoner of Zelda" and "Enemies, Negotiation and Deceit". Her name is a pun: Lowest price.
 Zeroid 35 is an inexperienced and overenthusiastic female Zeroid with a crush on Sergeant Major Zero. Originally posted to Spacehawk, she was later transferred to Hawknest after her bravery during the Watchdog affair. Voiced by Beth Chalmers, she appears in "Return to Sender", "Renta-hawks", "My Enemy's Enemy", "No Second Chances", "Living Legend", and "The Prisoner of Zelda".
 Justin Thyme is an American presenter on the TV21 channel who can always be relied upon to provide plot-related news bulletins. Voiced by Robbie Stevens, he appears in "Deadly Departed", "Clubbed to Death", and "Star Crossed". His name is a pun: Just in time.
 Crusher was a bouncer at Dick Branston's club, and later filled much the same role at Starsons Studios. He is a huge fan of Kate Kestrel and frequently asks her to sign various parts of his body. Voiced by Robbie Stevens, he appears in "Clubbed to Death", "Sale of the Galaxy" and "Star Crossed".
 Dick Branston was a morally bankrupt billionaire with an eye for the ladies and any questionable money-making scheme. After a plot to destroy his own nightclub went awry he later founded Global Rescue, an organisation dedicated to saving anyone in distress – providing they can pay, of course. Voiced by Jeremy Hitchen, he appeared in "Clubbed to Death" and "Renta-hawks".
 Kent Domuch is the "utterly unworthy" President of the Official Zelda Appreciation Society. Despite Zelda's frequent attempts to kill this fawning fan she somehow never quite manages to succeed. Voiced by Jeremy Hitchen, he appears in "Deadly Departed" and "My Enemy's Enemy". His name is a pun: Can't do much.
 Honor Spot is a roving World Comms reporter who has appeared on both TV21 and FAB FM. Voiced by Beth Chalmers, she appears in "The Wrong Clone Number" and "Star Crossed". Her name is a pun: On the spot.
 Dr. Chemi Rouge is a French NASA scientist and former flame of Tiger Ninestein's. She was in command of Lunarville 16 during the Watchdog affair and later transferred to Lunarville 8 to supervise the Ato-max project. Voiced by Denise Bryer, she appears in "Return to Sender" and "Enemies, Negotiation and Deceit".

Spin offs

Comics
A comic strip adaptation was drawn by Jim Baikie for Look-In magazine.

Video game
The 1982 shoot 'em up Attack of the Timelord! for the Odyssey 2 console was rebranded as Gerry Anderson's Terrahawks for its UK release, where it was published by CRL in 1984. It was one of the first video games with a TV show tie-in.

Zeroids Vs Cubes
On 10 December 2014, an animated spin-off web series was announced titled Zeroids Vs Cubes. It is produced by IDO Design & Animation and Anderson Entertainment and it came to YouTube on 19 June 2015. Both Jeremy Hitchen and Robbie Stevens reprised their roles as the Sergeant Major Zero and Space Sergeant 101. However, only one episode was released.

Episodes

Kate Kestrel And The Terrahawks revival
On 12 August 2019, Anderson Entertainment announced that a revival of Terrahawks is currently in the works entitled Kate Kestrel And The Terrahawks. They revealed that it is to be co-produce with Tiny Giant and "is being executively produced by Jamie Anderson (Gerry Anderson’s Firestorm) and Stu Gamble (Mansour, Nexo Knights). Showrunner is Mark Hoffmeier (Spider-Man, Nexo Knights, Marvel Super Heroes – Guardians of the Galaxy: The Thanos Threat) who is producing with Mike Penketh (Bob’s Burgers, Gravity Falls, Wander Over Yonder and Tron) and Vicky Kjaer Jensen (Ninjago)"

References

External links

 Terrahawks at the Gerry Anderson website
 
 
 The Terrahawks Cyber Pages
 Terrahawks Series 1 at Big Finish Productions
 Terrahawks Series 2 at Big Finish Productions
 Terrahawks Series 3 at Big Finish Productions

1980s British science fiction television series
1980s British children's television series
1983 British television series debuts
1986 British television series endings
Alien invasions in television
Androids in television
AP Films
Aviation television series
British children's action television series
British children's adventure television series
British children's science fiction television series
British action television series
British science fiction television shows
British television shows featuring puppetry
English-language television shows
Fictional military organizations
ITV children's television shows
London Weekend Television shows
Mars in television
Space adventure television series
Television series about cloning
Television series set in 2020
Television shows adapted into comics
Television shows adapted into video games
Television shows set in South America